Leon Zervos is a mastering engineer who has worked with many world-renowned artists, including Pink, Rihanna, Maroon 5, Beastie Boys, and Willie Nelson.

Life and career 
Leon Zervos began his mastering career in 1982 at the then EMI Studios 301 in Sydney, where he worked with the likes of INXS, Crowded House, and Midnight Oil. Moving to New York City in 1992, he worked mastering for Absolute Audio for six years, before taking on the role of Senior mastering engineer at Masterdisk in 1993, where he added artists such as Aerosmith, Mobb Deep, Maroon 5, Avril Lavigne, Gavin DeGraw, Duran Duran, Ben Folds and NSYNC to his mastering portfolio, with some of the music he mastered going on to win GRAMMY Awards. Zervos left Masterdisk in 2003, becoming senior mastering engineer at Sterling Sound in New York City, until 2009 when he returned to Sydney.

Leon Zervos currently works as a mastering engineer at Studios 301 in Sydney, Australia.  He works with a wide variety of genres, including pop, jazz, country, metal, R&B, dance, and orchestral, boasting Platinum selling credits in each category.

Credits 
Leon Zervos is credited as the Mastering engineer on all of the following recordings

References 

Australian audio engineers
Living people
Mastering engineers
Year of birth missing (living people)